Jangipara Assembly constituency is an assembly constituency in Hooghly district in the Indian state of West Bengal.

Overview
As per orders of the Delimitation Commission, No. 195 Jangipara Assembly constituency is composed of the following: Jangipara community development block and Ainya, Haripur, Masat and Shiyakhala gram panchayata of Chanditala I community development block.

Jangipara Assembly constituency is part of No. 27 Sreerampur (Lok Sabha constituency).

Members of Legislative Assembly

Election results

2021

2016

2011

 
  

 
 

.# Swing calculated on Congress+Trinamool Congress vote percentages taken together in 2006.

2006

 
  

.# Swing calculated on BJP+Trinamool Congress vote percentages taken together in 2006.

1977-2006
In the 2006 state assembly elections, Sudarshan Raychaudhuri of CPI(M) won the Jangipara assembly seat defeating Ehsanul Haque Kazi of Trinamool Congress. Contests in most years were multi cornered but only winners and runners are being mentioned. Ibha Dey of CPI(M) defeated Shahbazin Khan Munshi of Trinamool Congress in 2001 and Dwipen Mukherjee of Congress in 1996. Manindranath Jana of CPI(M) defeated Gayatri Roy of Congress in 1991, Dwipen Mukherjee of Congress in 1987, Ganesh Chandra Hatui of Congress 1982 and 1977.

1957-1972
Ganesh Hatui of Congress won in 1972. Manindranath Jana of CPI(M) won in 1971, 1969 and 1967. Biswanath Saha of Congress won in 1962. Biswanath Saha and Kanai Dey, both of Congress, won the Jangipara double seat in 1957. Prior to that the Jangipara assembly seat did not exist.

References

Assembly constituencies of West Bengal
Politics of Hooghly district